The Jubilee Theatre, is a grade II listed building theatre.  It opened in 1899 in St Nicholas Hospital, Gosforth, Newcastle upon Tyne, England.

History 
The Victorian theatre was opened on 30 May 1900. It features a proscenium arch of Doulton tiles by W.J. Neatby, depicting two pre-Raphaelite figures which face east and west, as the theatre faces true north and south.

Originally, the theatre had a sprung dance floor made from maple and a full sized orchestra pit, and was used for both shows and dances.

So that films could be shown in the theatre a projection room was added to the back of the building in 1920 housing at least two movie projectors.

Two doors lead into the theatre from the main corridor. The male and female patients at the hospital were constantly separated; men would enter using the door on the left, and women the right door. Rules dictated that men stayed on the left of the auditorium and women on the right, and were only allowed together for dancing. On the men's side there is a door out to a corridor which was previously used as the 'Gentlemen's Smoking Promenade' and is now used as a fire corridor.

Current usage 
Currently the theatre is primarily used by three groups: Juniper Productions a drama group for sufferers of mental health difficulties, which was founded in 1998 First Act Theatre, a youth theatre company who have operated from the theatre since 1991 And Stepping Out A drama group

Notable actors 
The Jubilee Theatre has been a stage to a number of actors during their early career, including:

 Jill Halfpenny
 Donna Air
 Dale Meeks
 Cheryl Tweedy
 Michael O'Riordan

References

External links 
 Juniper Productions
 First Act Theatre
 Jubilee Theatre Photographs

Buildings and structures in Newcastle upon Tyne
Theatres in Newcastle upon Tyne